Island Lake is a glacial tarn in the Ruby Mountains of Elko County, Nevada, United States. It is within the Ruby Mountains Ranger District of the Humboldt-Toiyabe National Forest. The lake is a hanging valley at the end of a  trail that begins at a parking lot at the end of Lamoille Canyon Road.

It is a popular site for day trips, fishing, and camping.

Island Lake is a minor source of flow for Lamoille Creek, which after exiting the mountains passes through the town of Lamoille, meanders down Lamoille Valley, and then merges with the main branch of the Humboldt River.

See also
 List of lakes in Nevada

References

Ruby Mountains
Lakes of Nevada
Lakes of Elko County, Nevada
Lakes of the Great Basin
Humboldt–Toiyabe National Forest